King River is a small town in the Great Southern region of Western Australia. It is located 406 km south east of Perth and the closest populated town is Albany.

The town takes its name from the King River which is located nearby; another town, Lower King is further down river on Oyster Harbour.

References 

Towns in Western Australia
Great Southern (Western Australia)